The Pfaffen Saddle (el. 1372 m.) is a high mountain pass in the Austrian Alps in the Bundesland of Styria.

It connects Rettenegg and Steinhaus am Semmering.

See also
 List of highest paved roads in Europe
 List of mountain passes

Mountain passes of Styria
Mountain passes of the Alps
Fischbach Alps